Békés Airport is a civilian airport located  east of the centre of Békéscsaba in Hungary and is named after the Békés County.

History 
The airport was developed in the wake of World War II as a result of military needs for an airfield, although the region did already have air access through the Szentesi airfield. It received the first aircraft in 1943.

The 12th FAI World Aerobatic Championships were held at the airport where Peter Besenyei achieved excellent results.

In 2006, the airport underwent substantial modernization which included paving of the main runway and taxi ways and modern lighting. While currently there are no regular or chartered commercial flights, the airport operator and local politics are working to establish such as soon as possible.

In December 2008, an upgrade of the hangars has been completed which can since accommodate 8-seater aircraft.

Through July 23-31, 2010, the FAI Control Line World Championships were held at the airport. This includes the FAI events F2A, F2B, F2C, and F2D. In the F2B event, the Junior class winner was Ryan Young and the Open class winner was (?).

Location 

References 

Airports in Hungary
Buildings and structures in Békéscsaba